Manuel Escobar (6 August 1924 – 8 March 1995) was a Salvadoran sailor. He competed in the Flying Dutchman event at the 1968 Summer Olympics.

References

External links
 

1924 births
1995 deaths
Salvadoran male sailors (sport)
Olympic sailors of El Salvador
Sailors at the 1968 Summer Olympics – Flying Dutchman
Sportspeople from San Salvador
Speed climbers